David S. Wilkinson is a Canadian material scientist and engineer, currently Provost and Vice-President and Distinguished University Professor at McMaster University. In 1985–1986 Alexander von Humboldt Foundation Fellowship for research in Germany, held at the Max Planck Institute for Metals Research, Stuttgart. 1996, Elected Chair, Gordon Research Conference on Solid State Studies in Ceramics. 1996, Best Materials Paper, Canadian Metallurgical Quarterly 1999, Fellowship of the Canadian Institute of Mining, Metallurgy and Petroleum 2000 2000 Fellowship of the American Ceramic Society.

References

Canadian engineers
Living people
Canadian materials scientists
Academic staff of McMaster University
Year of birth missing (living people)